Beğendik is a Turkish place name and may refer to the following places in Turkey:

Places
 Beğendik, Keşan, a town in the Keşan district of Edirne Province
 Beğendik, Demirköy, a village in the Demirköy district of Kırklareli Province
 Beğendik, Tercan
 Begendik, Olur

Others
 Beğendik Bridge, a road bridge in southeastern Turkey

Turkish toponyms